"Bir Oluruz Yolunda" ("We Are United on Your Way") also known as "Milli Takım" is a modified version of the song Taş on Tarkan's previous album Karma. The modifications in the song were made for the Turkish national soccer team's entry to the 2002 World Cup.

Track list
 Bir Oluruz Yolunda, 2002
 Bir Oluruz Yolunda Orijinal Version (4:16)
 Bir Oluruz Yolunda Alternatif Version (4:20)

External links
 Single and Song Lyrics Information in English

2002 singles
Tarkan (singer) songs
Songs written by Tarkan (singer)
Turkish-language songs
2002 songs